Maqu County is a county of the Gannan Tibetan Autonomous Prefecture in the south of Gansu province of the People's Republic of China, bordering the provinces of Sichuan to the east and southeast, and Qinghai to the southwest, west and northwest. Its postal code is 747300, and in 1999 its population was 36,213 people. The area of Maqu County is 10,191 km2 with an average altitude of 3,700 meters. Maqu County receives high rainfall and is located at the northern edge of the Zoigê Marshes on the Yellow River where conditions are optimal for alpine meadow vegetation.

Administrative divisions
Maqu County (玛曲县) is divided to 6 towns and 2 townships.
Towns

Townships
 Oulaxiuma Township
 Muxihe  Township

Climate

See also
 List of administrative divisions of Gansu

References

Maqu County
Gannan Tibetan Autonomous Prefecture